Beth Gazo (literary "the house of treasure") is a Syriac liturgical book that contains a collection of Syriac chants and melodies. The book is considered a reference of Syriac Hymnody and without it clerics belonging to the  West Syriac Tradition cannot perform their liturgical duty.

History
The origin of Beth Gazo can be traced back to the early centuries of Christianity going as far as Bardaisan (154–222 CE). However, the bulk of the hymns is attributed to Ephrem the Syrian (306 – 373 CE).

There are two main traditions in chanting: western based on the School of Mardin and eastern in Tikrit formerly. There is a daily breviary found in the Syriac Orthodox Church called "Shehimo: Book of Common Prayer" where the West Syriac style of chants and melodies from Beth Gazo are followed.

Contents
The abridged version of Beth Gazo contain the following hymns:
Qole shahroye "vigils". These were sung by those belonging to the order of shahroye "vigilants". they are dedicated to the Virgin, the saints, to penitence and the departed.
Gushmo "body". Each of which consists of eight modes. These are recited during the daily offices known as šḥimo.
Sebeltho d'madroshe "ladder of hymns". It is this category that seems to have mostly inherited Ephrem's.
Fardo "single". These are short hymns divided into eight collections corresponding to the eight Syriac maqams.
Qonuno yawnoyo "Greek canon". Divided into eight collections.
Mawrbo "magnificat". Dedicated to the Virgin Mary.
Qole ghnize "mystic hymns". Those were lost.
Takheshphotho rabuloyotho "litanies of Rabula". Attributed to Rabbula bishop of Edessa.
Tborto "broken". They fall into three categories: those attributed to St. Jacob of Serug, St. Ephrem the Syrian and of St. Balai of Qenneshrin.
Quqlion "cycles". These are cycles from the Psalms.

References

Gregorios Y. IBRAHIM, Ephrem's Madroshe and the Syrian Orthodox Beth Gazo: A Loose, But Fascinating, Affinity, Hugoye
The Treasury of Chants, Hugoye
History of The Syriac Music Church, Abrohom Lahdo and Elias Zazi

Music
Hymnology
Texts in Syriac